Bhagyarekha is an Indian Telugu language soap opera premiered on 24 June 2019 aired on Gemini TV every Monday to Saturday ended on 6 November 2021 with 614 episodes. The serial stars Maanya Anand and Maneesh as main protagonists and Bharani Shankar, in pivotal role. The show is the remake of the Tamil television series Nayaki, however it had a different climax.

Plot
The series revolves around the three strong women. Siri was a sweet natured, yet bold girl was raised in poverty unaware of being a rich heir due to certain circumstances. Sunanda, the lady of an empire but a bird in a gilded cage, yearns to avenge her husband Devendra varma's misdeeds. Chittemma is arrogant but kind lady who has risen amidst all put downs but failed to bond with her loved ones. The story is about how fate entwines their lives. Siri works in retail stores and co-worker Meena became a best friend. Devendra is the business man who has eyes upon wealth of the girl, realised that the legal heir is still alive while his attempts to clinch her wealth. On the other hand, Devendra's son Rishi met Siri and he loves Siri. Will Siri realize her roots and how she will safeguard and own her wealth is main plot of the story.

Cast

Main
Divya Ganesh (1-215) as Sirisha aka Siri (Rishi's wife and Legal heir of property under Devendra)
 Yashaswini K Swamy (215-247) → Ishwarya Vullingala (247-315) → Maanya (315 - 614) as Sirisha aka Siri (Replacements of Divya Ganesh)
Maneesh as Maharshi aka Rishi
Hrithi (1-234) → Shivani(235-614) as Neha (central minister Kishan's daughter)
Bharani Shankar as Devendra Varma (Rishi and Deepthi's Father)

Supporting
Raghamadhuri (1-246) /Durga Devi(247-614) as Sunanda(Rishi and Deepthi's mother)
Sri Rithika as Meena (Siri's best friend and Vasu's wife)
Revathi as Lawyer Aruna
Sridevi as Ravali (Neha's Aunt)
Archana
Tonisha Kapileswarapu as Maya
Raghava P Venkat (1-224)/Chakri (225-614) as Raghava (Devendra's personal Assistant)
Kranthi as Revathi (Siri's biological mother)
Kalpana Reddy(1-205) → Sharanya Janjam (206 - 395) as Deepthi, Rishi's sister
Devaraj Reddy aa Siddharth, Raghava's son
Sri Laxmi as Bharathi
Nalini as Chittemma (Vasu, Varun and Kaveri's mother)
Posani Krishnamurali as Nanda Kumar
Kalyan as Vasu
Kaveri as Vasanthi, Vasu's younger sister
Kushal Naidu as Varun, Vasu's younger brother
Master Venkat showrya as Surya (Nani), Siri's brother
Balaji as Narayana Murthy(Siri's foster father)
Ravuri Ramesh as Kishan (Central Minister and Devendra's friend)
Kota Shankar rao as Yadagiri, Meena's father
Naveena as Sujatha, Meena's mother
Abhiram as Viswaroop
Sunithamanohar as Viswaroop's mother
Shirisha as Siddharth's mother
Seethamaalakshmi as Sravani
Niranjan as Veerraju (deceased)
Ajay as Bhupathi, Siri's biological father-deceased (cameo appearance)
Sravanthi as Revathi, Siri's biological mother (cameo appearance)

Adaptations

Crossover episodes
From 9 November 2020 to 13 November 2020 in episodes 322 to 325 Bhagyarekha had a crossover with Pournami.

References

Indian television soap operas
Telugu-language television shows
2019 Indian television series debuts
Gemini TV original programming
Telugu-language television series based on Tamil-language television series